Glucose-6-phosphate dehydrogenase (coenzyme-F420) (coenzyme F420-dependent glucose-6-phosphate dehydrogenase, F420-dependent glucose-6-phosphate dehydrogenase, FGD1, Rv0407, F420-dependent glucose-6-phosphate dehydrogenase 1) is an enzyme with systematic name D-glucose-6-phosphate:F420 1-oxidoreductase. This enzyme catalyses the following chemical reaction

 D-glucose 6-phosphate + oxidized coenzyme F420  6-phospho-D-glucono-1,5-lactone + reduced coenzyme F420

Thus enzyme is specific for D-glucose 6-phosphate.

References

External links 
 

EC 1.1.98